Miss Luxembourg is a national Beauty pageant in Luxembourg.

History
The Miss Luxembourg pageant has existed since 1927. The winner is expected to become the brand ambassador of the country. The national committee has required the candidates to have Luxembourg citizenship, to be between 18 and 26 years of age, to have a good reputation, to be unmarried, to have no children, to be ready to serve in social and humanitarian actions, and must not have posed for any nude photos. Between 1959 and 1994 the winner represented the country at Miss Universe pageant. Later, Miss Luxembourg is expected to represent Luxembourg at the Miss World competition. The committee has exciting new announcements in 2010. 2009 is the first time after 23 years that a Miss Luxembourg is participating in Miss World. It is also the first year a Mister Luxembourg contest has ever taken place, and it is the first time such a trip has been organised for the finalists. The latest winners of Miss Luxembourg going to Miss World were Melanie Heynsbroek in 2019 and Emilia Bolan in 2021

Titleholders

References

External links 

Beauty pageants in Luxembourg
Luxembourgian awards
Luxembourg